Del Monte Shopping Center, also known as Del Monte Center, is an open-air shopping center located in Monterey, California. Del Monte Center is the largest shopping center on the Monterey Peninsula and has the only department store in a 22-mile radius. Del Monte Center was designed by architect John Carl Warnecke, built by Williams and Burrows Construction Company and originally opened in 1967 but expanded and renovated in 1987. The shopping center encompasses  of retail space including 85 stores, one department store (Macy's), Whole Foods Market, restaurants (California Pizza Kitchen, P.F. Chang's China Bistro, Pizza My Heart, Islands Fine Burgers & Drinks, Subway, Chipotle Mexican Grill, Starbucks and Lalla Grill), a gym and spa (Energia) and a thirteen screen Century Theatres. Petco was added in 2004, replacing Stroud's. The existing theater complex moved in 2006, with the former complex becoming a furniture store for Macy's.

In 2007, Del Monte Center started a major renovation project which included the addition of several new high-end retailers. Banana Republic opened in Fall 2007, with Pottery Barn and Williams Sonoma following in the spring of 2008. This renovation also included a new restaurant, P.F. Chang's China Bistro, which replaced Marie Callender's. The first  Apple retail store in the Monterey region opened at Del Monte Center on August 9, 2008. Other new stores include Lucky Brand Jeans, Hollister Co., Lucy and most recently Pandora Jewelry.

On January 6, 2021, Macy's announced that the Macy's furniture store would be closing in April 2021 as part of a plan to close 46 stores nationwide.

The center is owned by American Assets Trust.

Community events

The Del Monte Center hosts a number of community events throughout the year. These include Musical Marketplace, a series of concerts that raise money for charity, and the weekly Monterey Bay Community Farmers Market every Sunday morning.

Location

The Del Monte Center is located at the intersection of Highways 1 & 68, Munras Avenue and Soledad Drive in Monterey.

References

Website

Buildings and structures in Monterey, California
Shopping malls in Monterey County, California
Tourist attractions in Monterey, California
Shopping malls established in 1967